Marhaenism, is a socialistic political ideology originating and developed by the first President of Indonesia, Sukarno. It was developed from the thought of Marxism, which is applied according to the nature and culture of Indonesia or simply as "Marxism adapted to Indonesian conditions."

Marhaenism is a variant of Marxism but emphasizes national unity, culture, collectivist economics, and democratic rights and condemns liberalism and individualism. It was established as an anticapitalist and anti-imperialist ideology, but it combines both Western and Eastern principles. Marhaenism was the guiding ideology of the Indonesian National Party.

Etymology 
The name of the ideology is said to be taken that of a land-poor farmer, Marhaen (d. 1943), whom Sukarno met in 1926-1927. Sukarno attributed the farmer's poverty to a lack of access to production tools. Sukarno took to referring to members of the agrarian class as "Marhaens," a term that was first used by Sukarno in his Indonesia Accuses (Indonesia Menggugat) speech in 1930 to replace the term proletariat, as he considered the latter to be largely irrelevant to Indonesia. Defining "proletariat" as members of the working class not owning their own labour power, Sukarno pointed out that many Indonesian farmers owned their labour power and used it primarily for themselves, in spite of their poverty.

Ideology 
Marhaenism is essentially a struggle ideology formed from social nationalism, social democracy, and the cultural divinity from Sukarno's beliefs.

According to marhaenism, to be economically independent and free from exploitation by other parties, each person or household needs factors of production or capital. The form can be in the form of land or machines/tools. In a modern context, vehicles, information technology devices, kitchen utensils, and electronic goods can be effectively used as capital or production factors. Although not large, the ownership of capital is necessary to ensure the independence of the person or household in the economy.

In contrast to capitalism, capital in marhaenism is not to be hoarded or multiplied but is to be processed to meet the necessities of life and produce a surplus. Farmers plant to feed their own families and then sell the surplus or excess to the market. Tailors, craftsmen, and laborers produce goods, which later some will be used by themselves although the rest is of course sold. Ideally, the self-sufficiency requirement should be met before serving the market. That means when workers, craftsmen, or farmers produce goods that will not be consumed by themselves, they act only as factors of production for others, which makes them vulnerable to being dictated by the market or exploited. In aggregate (overall) in a marhaenist economic system, goods that are not needed will not be produced because people and households must first ensure the profile and the level of their own needs before they make anything. The innovation of the birth of a new product will occur when the need is really concrete.

The method encourages the achievement of efficiency and prevents wasting resources and consumptive attitudes. Because it functions only to produce a surplus, the available capital cannot be hoarded or misappropriated to suppress the economic growth and the development of other parties.

The marhaenism that was referred to by Sukarno can be compared with the formulation of the entrepreneurship theory approach, which was introduced only in the 1970s by David McCleland, almost 50 years later. The difference is that McCleland puts more emphasis on the option of planting the need for achievement or the will to get ahead from the people or small entrepreneurs and so it is in fact dominated by a functional approach. Sukarno's approach to marhaen (farmers and small traders) is actually structural, through the cultivation of a progressive revolutionary attitude. 

In a speech before the United Nations General Assembly, September 30, 1960, Sukarno firmly stated that Pancasila was essentially a sublimation of the United States Declaration of Independence and the Communist Manifesto. That means that Pancasila is actually the third alternative from the two opposing camps in the Cold War between the Western Bloc and the Eastern Bloc at that time.

Bibliography 

 Sukarno. (2000). Marhaenism . Promedia.
 Saksono, Ignatius Gatut. (2008) Bung Karno's Marhaenism . Yabinkas Learning House.
 Pour, Julius. (2010). The September 30th Movement: doers, heroes & adventurers.
 Soerojo, Soegiarso. (1988). Whoever sows the wind will reap the storm.

References 

Eponymous political ideologies
History of socialism
Political history of Indonesia
Political movements in Indonesia
Socialism in Indonesia
Syncretic political movements
Socialism
Marxism
Sukarno